Lyudmila Andreevna Porgina (born November 24, 1948 in Moscow) is a Soviet and Russian stage and film actress, named an Honored Artist of the Russian Federation in 1999 and the widow of actor Nikolai Karachentsov.

References

External links 
 Megaencyclopedia of Cyril and Methodius: Lyudmila Porgina
 Lyudmila Porgina on the  7days.ru

Living people
1948 births
Actresses from Moscow
Soviet  actresses
Soviet film actresses
Soviet stage  actresses
Russian  actresses
Russian film actresses
Russian stage  actresses
20th-century Russian actresses
21st-century Russian actresses
Honored Artists of the Russian Federation
Moscow Art Theatre School alumni